Heuthen is a municipality in the district of Eichsfeld in Thuringia, Germany. It is the seat of a fourth-order administrative division. In 2017 it had a population of 764.

References

Eichsfeld (district)